"End Times" is the twelfth and penultimate episode of the fourth season of the American television drama series Breaking Bad, and the 45th overall episode of the series. It originally aired on AMC in the United States on October 2, 2011. GQ and Salon.com named "End Times" as one of the best television episodes of 2011.

Plot
After receiving an anonymous warning from Saul Goodman about Hank Schrader having been targeted by a drug cartel, the DEA dispatches a squad of agents to guard Hank and Marie Schrader's house. The White family is also brought to the Schrader household for protection, but Walter White convinces Skyler White to let him stay behind at their own house, ready to face the consequences of his actions. Walt sits nervously in the backyard, spinning a gun on the table that keeps pointing at him, but takes note when it points at a potted plant. Hank deduces that his investigation of Gus Fring is the reason for the threat on his life, so he asks  Steve "Gomey" Gomez to search the industrial laundromat for him.

Gomez and an officer with a drug-sniffing dog later check out the laundromat but do not find anything, although Jesse Pinkman and Tyrus Kitt were below them in the hidden meth lab. Gus, in a phone call to Jesse, infers the police attention is Walter's fault, and Walter must be killed to protect the operation, but Jesse again refuses to cook if Walter is killed. Saul later hands Jesse's entire share of the meth profits to Jesse, since Saul is planning to temporarily flee Albuquerque until the feud between Walter and Gus is over. Saul reveals that Gus took Walter to the desert and threatened his family, a revelation by which Jesse is taken aback. Jesse later receives a call from Andrea Cantillo that her son, Brock Cantillo, has become seriously ill and is in the hospital. Jesse discovers that the ricin cigarette, which he kept handy to poison Gus, is missing and concludes that Brock somehow ingested the ricin.

Jesse confronts a paranoid Walter at the Whites' house. Jesse grabs Walter's gun and points it at him, accusing him of poisoning Brock out of spite. Walter claims that Gus must have planned Brock's poisoning and framed Walter for it in order to manipulate Jesse into killing him; the cameras around the lab probably spotted the cigarette, and Tyrus must have taken it out of Jesse's locker, tracked down Brock, and poisoned him. Walter and Jesse know Gus is not above killing children, after the death of Andrea's younger brother, Tomás Cantillo, and Jesse ultimately decides that Walter is innocent. The two team up to kill Gus.

Jesse visits the hospital daily, but Andrea will not let him see Brock after he divulges knowledge about the ricin poisoning. Jesse refuses to leave the hospital, which ruins the latest meth cook, and says he will only leave if Gus orders him to in person. When Gus arrives at the hospital, Walter plants a homemade bomb under Gus' car and watches from a nearby rooftop for the right moment to detonate it. As Gus and his bodyguards return to the car, Gus senses something is amiss and leaves the area, leaving Walter distraught about missing his chance.

Production
On the Breaking Bad Insider Podcast, director Vince Gilligan reveals that the crew faced time constraints during this episode's production. Consequently, Gilligan decided during filming to cut a scripted scene wherein Walt and Jesse formulate a plan to kill Gus. In addition, the episode was filmed concurrently with the following episode, "Face Off", in order to save time.

"End Times" is the only episode in the series that Gilligan directed without having written.

Reception
The episode received critical acclaim and it is regarded as one of Season 4's best episodes. Critics praised Aaron Paul's performance, the ending with Walt and Gus and the revelation in the episode that Brock is poisoned. Seth Amitin of IGN gave the episode a 9 out of 10.

In 2019 The Ringer ranked "End Times" as the 29th best out of the 62  Breaking Bad episodes.

Accolades
Aaron Paul won the Primetime Emmy Award for Outstanding Supporting Actor in a Drama Series at the 64th Primetime Emmy Awards for his performance in this episode.Kelley Dixon was also nominated for the Primetime Emmy Award for Outstanding Single-Camera Picture Editing for a Drama Series for this episode.

References

External links
"End Times" at the official Breaking Bad site

2011 American television episodes
Breaking Bad (season 4) episodes
Television episodes directed by Vince Gilligan